Morehouse School of Medicine is a private co-educational medical school in Atlanta, Georgia.  Originally a part of Morehouse College, the school became independent in 1981. The school abbreviates its name with its initials "MSM."

History

Establishment
Founded as a part of Morehouse College in 1975 during the tenure of college president Hugh M. Gloster, with Louis W. Sullivan, M.D. as dean, the School of Medicine at Morehouse College began as a two-year program in the basic sciences. The first students were admitted in 1978 and transferred to other medical schools for the clinical years of their training.

Independent institution

The institution became independent from Morehouse College in 1981, with Sullivan as President, and was fully accredited to award M.D. degrees in 1985. Initially, third year clinical courses were taught by faculty from Emory University's School of Medicine, but since 1990, the school has taught them itself. In 1989, Sullivan was appointed United States Secretary of Health and Human Services by President George H.W. Bush. Sullivan served in that role for Bush's entire term, until 1993, when he returned to MSM to begin his second tenure as president.

Sullivan remained president until 2002. He now holds the title of President Emeritus.

Former US Surgeon General David Satcher served as director of the National Center for Primary Care at the Morehouse School of Medicine. He continued in that role while also serving as MSM's president from 2004 to 2006.

On February 28, 2006, Morehouse School of Medicine announced the appointment of John E. Maupin Jr., D.D.S. as the institution's next president. Maupin departed from his position of president at Meharry Medical College.

Valerie Montgomery Rice, M.D. was named the sixth president of the school and the first woman to lead the free-standing medical institution in July 2014. In addition to president, she also retains the deanship. Montgomery Rice is a renowned infertility specialist and researcher, and most recently served as dean and executive vice president of MSM, where she served since 2011. In this role, she led MSM’s widespread academic and clinical programs in health sciences and led its strategic planning initiatives for patient care, research and community engagement.

On February 3, 2009, Eric Holder, then-vice chairman of MSM's board of trustees, was confirmed as U.S. Attorney General.

On July 13, 2009, President Barack Obama nominated Morehouse School of Medicine Trustee  Regina Benjamin as U.S. Surgeon General. Benjamin's nomination and subsequent confirmation marks the second time a MSM trustee held a high-profile position with the Obama administration.

A 2010 study ranked MSM as the number one medical school in the country in the terms of social mission.  The social mission score used in the study evaluated schools on percentage of graduates who practice primary care, work in health professional shortage areas, and are underrepresented minorities.

In 2017, it was announced MSM will complete a $50 million expansion by 2020. The expansion will include its first-ever student housing, an ambulatory health-care center, additional parking, and a retail component.

In July 2020, MSM received a $40 million grant from the United States Department of Health and Human Services to help redress the alarming COVID-19 pandemic impact on African-Americans and other more vulnerable communities. In September 2020, MSM received $26.3 million from philanthropist Michael Bloomberg to help lower debt for the medical students enrolled. 

In May 2022, MSM had a groundbreaking ceremony for a new $45 million academic facility.  The 52,300-square foot building is scheduled to be complete in early 2024.  The building is named after longtime MSM board member and state lawmaker Calvin Smyre.

Presidents

See also
Atlanta University Center

References

External links

 
Historically black universities and colleges in the United States
Private universities and colleges in Georgia (U.S. state)
Medical schools in Georgia (U.S. state)
Universities and colleges accredited by the Southern Association of Colleges and Schools
Educational institutions established in 1975
Universities and colleges in Atlanta
1975 establishments in Georgia (U.S. state)